Knowledge process outsourcing (KPO) describes the outsourcing of core information-related business activities which are competitively important or form an integral part of a company's value chain. KPO requires advanced analytical and technical skills as well as a high degree of specialist expertise. 

Reasons behind KPO include an increase in specialized knowledge and expertise, additional value creation, the potential for cost reductions, and a shortage of skilled labor. Regions which are particularly prominent in knowledge process outsourcing include India, Sri Lanka, and Eastern Europe, especially Poland, Romania, and the Baltic States.KPO is a continuation of business process outsourcing, yet with rather more of business complexity. To be successful in knowledge process outsourcing, a lot of guide is required from interorganizational system.

Types 
KPO services include all kinds of research and information gathering ,e.g., intellectual property research for patent applications; equity research, business and market research, legal and medical services; training, consultancy, and research and development in fields such as pharmaceuticals and biotechnology; and animation and design, etc.

Importance
The developing rivalry has brought about shorter time to market cycles, and clients are getting to be more demanding regarding quality. This has constrained the firms to give operational proficiency and increase the value of their products and services. The customer can launch an item quicker and get to the market immediately. A company can lessen the complexities included in overseeing and constantly constructing information in an extensive pool of human resources.

Businesses are constantly in search of reliable KPO service providers who have the ability to drive the best business strategy by analyzing the available data and information in a specific case.

Risks and benefits 
Benefits
 Cost reduction
 Shortage of skilled employees
 Provides many graduates at very low cost
 High end services are provided at a lower cost to decrease unemployment and benefit their economy 
 Provide flexibility in terms of HRM & time management

Risks
 Security- Classified information about the company can be lost
 Key talent retention
 The character of the employee and the quality of the work cannot be assured
 KPO is time consuming and cannot provide a quick fix to the company seeking immediate results.
 Lack of communication between partners due to  legal, language and cultural barriers can lead to complications
Quality of Personnel and Work Cannot Be Guaranteed 
Shortage of Skilled Employees 
Reduction in Communication due to Language barrier 
Inability to protect company's intellect property

Differentiation from BPO
A KPO firm requires considerably more skilled personnel than a BPO firm. Experts working in KPO keep on learning and accomplished professionals can power their aptitude to produce more income for the KPO firm. The main difference between a KPO firm and a BPO firm is that in a KPO firm, the customer is included amid the whole execution process.

Origin of the term 
Ashish Gupta, ex-COO of Evalueserve and co-founder & CEO of Benori Knowledge has often been credited with coining the term. Gupta, an alumnus of the Indian Institute of Technology Delhi, is also a Founder & Trustee of Ashoka University and Plaksha University, and serves on the boards of various companies. Published authors have credited him for coining the term in their works.

In India 
India has a large number of post-graduates, PhDs and MBAs who are involved in KPO. The Indian National Association of Software and Service Companies (NASSCOM) estimated the total market size of the KPO sector in India in 2006 to be $1.5 billion.  The year before, 2005, it had been $1.3 billion, with Evalueserve predicting that by 2010 it would be some $10 to $15 billion.  The Indian government was predicting that by 2010 India would have 15% of the global KPO market.  However, the global financial crisis, coupled with domestic economic problems such as the IPO of Reliance Power in 2009, caused people to re-evaluate these predictions, incurring worries that India's IT, BPO, and KPO sectors — which by then, combined, were $8.4 billion in export revenues — would be greatly affected by these factors. The worldwide KPO industry is expected to reach about US $17 billion by 2015, of which US $12 billion would be outsourced to India. Furthermore, the Indian KPO area is likewise anticipated that it will utilize more than 2, 50,000 KPO experts by 2015.

Challenges

The  KPO area has considerable measure of potential 
development in India. India confronts various efforts by securing itself as a worldwide KPO pioneer. The real test in setting up a KPO will be to obtain skilled employees. KPO organizations include high risk and confidentiality and the greater part of the work would be outsourced from the US. The area likewise obliges larger amount of control, confidentiality and enhanced risk management. Moreover, legal language and cultural barriers can result in genuine issues. Both organizations need to appreciate each other's corporate and national societies and find common helpful approaches to create successful participation.

In the Philippines 
The Philippines Knowledge Process Outsourcing (KPO) services are often called "non-voice" or back office services, referring to activities outside contact center, customer and IT support services. In 2014, the KPO sector comprised 40 percent of the country's outsourcing industry. The Information Technology and Business Process Outsourcing Association of the Philippines (IBPAP) predicts that the Philippine outsourcing sector will reach $25 billion in revenues and employ about 1.3 million people by 2016.

The KPO industry is different from the BPO in the respect of that the former is more resilient to artificial intelligence (AI) and automation. With the 4th Industrial Revolution, it is estimated that most job losses will occur in low value-added contact center (“voice”) and other BPO services. Other services impacted by AI and automation include medical transcription, basic 2D animation services, parts of IT technical support and back-office transactions. Advanced functions that are projected to become more in demand include analytics and optimization engines, automation enablement, clinical data analytics, remote health management, Virtual Reality (VR)/Augmented Reality (AR)-enabled animation and supply chain optimization.

Like India's KPO industry, the Philippine KPO sector has evolved along similar lines. Starting with contact center services and low-value back office work like data entry and IT maintenance, the country is now considered an established destination for animation and design and content/publishing KPO services (Sathe and Aradhana, Sourcingmag.com). Back office and non-voice services contributed $1.1 billion in revenues to the country's outsourcing sector in 2009. Former IBPAP executive director for information research Gillian Virata said that the Philippine KPO industry is expected to reach the same market size as the voice service sector by 2015-2016. Non-voice services are already growing at a faster rate than traditional voice services.

Non-voice services
Banking and Finance Services 
The banking and financial services industry is leading KPO activity in the country, with global financial institutions providing underwriting, research and analytics, training and consulting, profit and loss, risk mitigation, and other BFSI-related services. KPO vendors also provide strategic research, market research, financial services research, analytics, and competitive intelligence monitoring. 

Legal Services 
Companies from the Philippines are expected to compete strongly with Indian providers of legal and paralegal services to the United States. Besides its cultural affinity with the West and excellent English proficiency of its talent pool, the Philippines used to be an American colony, and its laws are patterned after those of the U.S. Integreon is an established legal services provider in the country, specializing in discovery, contract management, compliance, legal research and knowledge management, intellectual property, and due diligence. 

Medical Services and Research and Development 
Many Chinese research and development pharmaceutical firms have set up offices in Metro Manila due to relatively lower rental and operating costs compared to traditional destinations. The country also has a pool of 250,000 nursing graduates, about half of which are expected to be employed in the healthcare services sector in 2016.

Animation and Design 
The Philippines has established itself as a successful Animation and Design outsourcing destination. The Animation Council of the Philippines estimates that global animation industry revenues have been growing at 20 to 30 percent over the past few years, increasing demand for low-cost, highly skilled creative labor. The rise of the animation outsourcing industry in the Philippines began in the early 1980s, with FilCartoons, Burbank Animation Inc. and Asian Animation setting up operations in the country and providing animation exports to foreign companies. In 2008, the Philippines had over 50 animation companies, mostly small and medium-sized companies. Larger animation companies include TOEI Animation, Roadrunner and Toon City Animation Inc., which employs about 1,300 animators and artists (about 18 percent of the country's animation labor pool. Overall, the Philippines employed about 7,000 people in the animation sector in 2008 and generated up to US$97 million in 2006 and US$105 million in 2007.

In Eastern Europe 
Although India has traditionally been a KPO destination for North American, British, and Australian companies, with an increasing number of European companies are looking to Eastern Europe, especially the Baltic countries, to satisfy their KPO needs.

See also
Outsourcing
Legal outsourcing
Recruitment

References

Further reading 

 
 
 
 
 

Business process
Outsourcing